The 16th season of the FA Women's Premier League final table.

National Division

Top scorers

Northern Division

Southern Division

References

Soccerway table
Soccerway table

Eng
FA Women's National League seasons
Wom
1